Leopoldo Zea Aguilar (June 30, 1912 – June 8, 2004) was a Mexican philosopher.

Biography
Zea was born in Mexico City.

One of the integral Latin Americanism thinkers in history, Zea became famous thanks to his master's thesis, El Positivismo en México (Positivism in Mexico, 1943), in which he applied and studied positivism in the context of his country and the world during the transition between the 19th and 20th centuries. With it he began the defense of American Integration, first suggested by the Liberator and Statesman Simón Bolívar, giving it his own interpretation based in the context of neocolonialism during the separation of the American Empire and Mexico.

In his works, Zea demonstrates that historical facts aren't independent from ideas, and that they do not arise from what is considered unusual, but from simple reactions to certain situations of human life.

In his vision of a united Latin America, he defended his beliefs concerning the place of mankind in the region.  Zea explained that the discovery of 1492 was nothing more than a concealment in cultural and known terms, a product of the ideological cross-breeding of the configuration of the Latin American identity, a matter which he revealed on the 5th centenary in 1992. Later, he studied the ontological analysis of Latin America in the cultural and geo-historical planes.

Being of poor origin, Zea worked in 1933 in the office of Telégrafos Nacionales to help afford the costs of his secondary and university education.

Zea was associated with the National Autonomous University of Mexico (UNAM) beginning with his training as a professor and philosopher in 1943. In 1947, he founded the Faculty of Philosophy and gave lectures on History of Ideas in America. In 1954, he was appointed to a full-time position as a researcher at the Philosophical Studies Center of the university.  In 1966, he became director of the college, holding this position until 1970. During his time as Director he founded the Latin American Studies College (in 1966) and later founded the Coordination and Propagation Center of the UNAM Latin American Studies (1978). He received multiple awards including the Premio Nacional de Ciencias y Artes in 1980, the Premio Interamericano de Cultura "Gabriela Mistral" (of the OAS) and the Medalla Belisario Domínguez (of the Senate of Mexico) in 2000. Three years later he was cataloged and honored by the UNAM as the oldest professor to work continually without interruptions until his death.

Zea was compared to many diverse political, revolutionary, and intellectual personalities, such as Germán Arciniegas (who was his friend), Che Guevara, José Gaos (his mentor), Víctor Raúl Haya de la Torre, Andrés Bello, Simón Bolívar, Domingo Faustino Sarmiento and others.

His philosophy embodied his concept of a united Latin America, not in the terms of a utopia, but based in reality, and the renewal of the fight for a people in demand for said change. As a result, he opened up the discourse to other scholars of the subject in the future.

Publications
Superbus Philosophus
El positivismo en México. Nacimiento, apogeo y decadencia
Apogeo y decadencia del positivismo en México
En torno a una filosofía americana
Esquema para una historia del pensamiento en México
Ensayos sobre filosofía de la historia
Dos etapas del pensamiento en Hispanoamérica
Conciencia y posibilidad del mexicano
La filosofía como compromiso y otros ensayos
América como conciencia
La conciencia del hombre en la filosofía. Introducción à la filosofía
El Occidente y la conciencia de México
América en la conciencia de Europa
La filosofía en México
Del liberalismo à la revolución en la educación mexicana
Esquema para una historia de las ideas en Iberoamérica
América en la historia
Las ideas en Iberoamérica en el siglo XIX
La cultura y el hombre de nuestros días
Democracia y dictaduras en Latinoamérica
Dos ensayos
Latinoamérica y el mundo
Europa al margen de Occidente
Antología del pensamiento social y político en América Latina
Latinoamérica en la formación de nuestro tiempo
El pensamiento latinoamericano
Antología de la filosofía americana contemporánea
La filosofía americana como filosofía sin más
Colonización y descolonización de la cultura latinoamericana
La esencia de lo americano
Latinoamérica. Emancipación y neocolonialismo
Los precursores del pensamiento latinoamericano contemporáneo
Dependencia y liberación en la cultura latinoamericana
Dialéctica de la conciencia americana
La filosofía actual en América Latina (Coauthor)
Filosofía latinoamericana
Filosofía y cultura latinoamericanas
Latinoamérica, Tercer Mundo
Filosofía de la historia americana
Pensamiento positivista latinoamericano (Selection and prologue)
Simón Bolívar, integración en libertad
Desarrollo de la creación cultural latinoamericana
Latinoamérica en la encrucijada de la historia
Sentido de la difusión cultural de América Latina
Latinoamérica, un nuevo humanismo
La transformación de la filosofía latinoamericana
Filosofía de lo americano
América como autodescubrimiento
El problema cultural de América
Discurso desde la marginación y la barbarie

References and further reading
 Mario Saenz: The Identity of Liberation in Latin American Thought: Latin American Historicism and the Phenomenology of Leopoldo Zea, Lanham, Md. ; Oxford : Lexington Books, 1999
 José Luis Gómez Martínez. Leopoldo Zea. El hombre y su obra. Madrid: Ediciones del Orto, 1997.
 José Luis Gómez Martínez. "Leopoldo Zea: reflexiones para asumir críticamente su obra".Cuadernos Americanos 107 (2004): 31–44.
 Alejandro Sánchez El Estallido de la Verdad en América Latina - Revista Nómadas- Critical review on Latin American philosophy and Zea's ´modernity´
 Roberto Colonna, Filosofía sin más. Leopoldo Zea e i "Cuadernos Americanos", Firenze: Le Cáriti, 2008.
 Roberto Colonna, Hable con Él Leopoldo Zea’s Last Interview , Journal of Philosophical Research 39, 2014, 253–263, https://doi.org/10.5840/jpr20148415

Specific

External links
Leopoldo Zea in the Centro Virtual Cervantes Biography, chronology, critical studies, interview, anthology, bibliography
Leopoldo Zea in the Proyecto Ensayo Hispánico Biography, work, bibliography, anthology, critical studies
The ‘philosophy of liberation’ in Latin America at the end of the 20th century by Hans Schelkshorn
“History of the Ideas” and Leopoldo Zea by María Ester Chamorro
About the humanism of Leopoldo Zea by Tzvi Medin
Leopoldo Zea, A letter to people I shall never meet, UNESCO - Letters to future generations project

1912 births
2004 deaths
People from Mexico City
Latin Americanists
Recipients of the Belisario Domínguez Medal of Honor
20th-century Mexican philosophers
Positivists
Ontologists